Daniel Bernhardt (born 31 August 1965) is a Swiss actor, model, and martial artist.

Career
Bernhardt made his acting debut in the leading role in Bloodsport II: The Next Kumite (1996). He also appeared in two of its sequels and starred in Future War (1997), True Vengeance (1997), Perfect Target (1997), G2 - Mortal Conquest (1999), Black Sea Raid (2000) and Global Effect (2002). In 1998-1999, he starred in the TV series Mortal Kombat: Conquest.

In 2003, he appeared as Agent Johnson in The Matrix Reloaded (2003), and in 2005 he appeared with Chuck Norris in The Cutter. In 2007 he appeared in Children of Wax. 

In 2013, he returned to acting with Jason Statham in Parker (2013) and in a cameo in The Hunger Games: Catching Fire (2013) as the male tribute from District 9. He trained with the 87Eleven Stunt Team and played Russian hitman Kirill in John Wick and the following year, he made his Bollywood debut as mixed martial arts fighter Max Potter in the remake of Warrior, titled Brothers. He co-starred in a particularly acclaimed episode of HBO's Barry as Ronny Proxin. In September 2020, it was announced that Bernhardt was reprising his Matrix role as Agent Johnson in The Matrix Resurrections; however, his scenes were cut from the final film.

Personal life
Bernhardt is proficient in Karate and Taekwondo.

Filmography

Cinema 
Bloodsport II: The Next Kumite (1996) - Alex Cardo
Bloodsport III (1997) - Alex Cardo
Future War (1997) - The Runaway
True Vengeance (1997) - Allen Griffin
Perfect Target (1997) - David Benson
Bloodsport 4: The Dark Kumite (1999) - Keller
G2 - Mortal Conquest (1999) - Steven Conlin
Black Sea Raid (2000) - Rick
Global Effect (2002) - Lieutenant Marcus Poynt
The Matrix Reloaded (2003) - Agent Johnson
The Librarians (2003) - Toshko
Confessions of an Action Star (2005) - Jason Everstrong
Tornado - Rain to Kill (2005)
The Cutter (2005) - Dirk Cross
Children of Wax (2007) - Murat
Supreme Champion (2010) - Lucien Gallows
Creature (2011) - Lockjaw / Grimley
Foodfight! (2012) - Additional Voices (voice)
Santa's Summer House (2012) - Bryan
Parker (2013) - Kroll
The Hunger Games: Catching Fire (2013) - District 9 Male Tribute
Zombeo & Juliécula (2013) - Vladimir
Knock 'em Dead (2014) - Victor The Butler
John Wick (2014) - Kirill
The Vatican Tapes (2015) - Psych Ward Security (uncredited)
Brothers (2015) - Max Potter
Precious Cargo (2016) - Simon
Term Life (2016) - Detective Rick DiNardi (uncredited)
Logan (2017) - 'Bone Breaker'
Atomic Blonde (2017) - Soldier
Kill 'Em All (2017) - Radovan Brokowski
Escape Plan: The Extractors (2019) - Silva
Hobbs & Shaw (2019) - Henchman (uncredited)
Birds of Prey (2020) - Sionis' Chauffeur
Skylines (2020) - Owens
Hell Hath No Fury (2021) - Von Bruckner
Nobody (2021) - Bus Goon
Red Notice (2021) - Drago Grande (cameo role)
The Matrix Resurrections (2021) - Agent Johnson

Television 
Mortal Kombat: Conquest (1998-1999, 22 episodes) - Siro
Desire (2006, 4 episodes) - Vincent
Castle (2016, 1 episode Season 8 Episode 2 "XX") - Vincent
Jean-Claude Van Johnson (2017)
Altered Carbon (2018) - Jaeger
Barry (2019, Episode: "ronny/lily") - Ronny Proxin

References

External links

1965 births
Living people
Swiss male film actors
Swiss male television actors
Swiss male karateka
Swiss male models
Swiss male taekwondo practitioners